KBQI (107.9 FM, "Big I 107.9") is a radio station in Albuquerque, New Mexico which carries a country music format, owned by iHeartMedia, Inc.  Its studios are located in Northeast Albuquerque, and the transmitter tower is located atop Sandia Crest east of the city.

KBQI takes its branding, "Big I 107-9", from the I-40 and I-25 interchange near downtown Albuquerque that is locally known as "the Big I". At the time of the station's launch in July 2000, the "Big I" was at the start of a major reconstruction project which had finished in May 2002. The station also launched with former KRST morning personalities Tony Lynn and Myles Copeland taking the morning shift at the new station. This helped to make KBQI competitive with KRST which had once dominated the format in the market. Tony and Myles had hosted mornings for 11 years until they were let go in October 2011. The syndicated Bobby Bones Show now airs in mornings.

In February 2006 the station began broadcasting in HD Radio with an additional HD-2 subchannel that played country variety. On June 21, 2013 the HD subchannel began to air a classic country music format re-broadcasting on translator K251AU on 98.1 FM.

Station history
This station would sign on April 27, 1979 as KFMG with an album oriented rock format programmed by Frank Felix that featured a tight playlist of about 239 songs in an effort to create a more mass appeal format as proven by the success of KBPI in Denver. Carey Curelop soon assumed programming duties making the station top rated among its target audience. KFMG, branded as "Rock 108", would continue to be one of the Albuquerque radio markets' highest rated stations for much of the 1980s. In May 1985 KFMG and AM sister station KAMX 1520 were sold to Coastal Communications for $2,125,000 in cash. However by the end of the 80s KFMG experienced declining ratings falling further behind rival KZRR "94 Rock" and by 1990 would face a new competitor, KRBL 98.5, which edged past them in the Fall 1990 Arbitron ratings. In early March 1991 the station would flip to a hot adult contemporary format with most of the airstaff let go.

Following the flip to Hot AC the station changed the call letters to KAMX-FM branded as "Mix 107.9". The format however would not be a strong performer in the market. In June 1994 Coastal Communications would sell KAMX AM & FM to Bengal Communications for $750,000. Bengal would also purchase easy listening format KKJY 100.3 for $1.5 million.

On October 17, 1994, KAMX-FM began stunting with a gag format made up of sound effects and on October 19 at 5pm switched to a modern rock format while KAMX discontinued its simulcast. A month later the call letters would change to KTEG branded as "107.9 The Edge" Albuquerque's New Rock Alternative. The new format quickly improved ratings for the station putting in the top 10 while becoming the leading rock station in the market for a while. In March 1996 Bengal would sell KTEG, KDZZ 1520 and KHTZ 100.3 to Trumper Communications for $7.4 million. In June of that year Trumper would also purchase KZRR 94.1 and AM simulcast KZSS 610 and classic rock formatted KLSK 104.1. The format on KTEG would be unchanged while KZRR shifted to a mainstream rock format but Trumper would also flip 100.3 to a modern adult contemporary format which would consequentially create fragmentation in the alternative format. In August 1999 Trumper would sell the Albuquerque cluster (which now included 95.1 added earlier in the year) to Clear Channel Communications for $55.5 million. After entering the Albuquerque radio market Clear Channel opted to challenge the top rated station KRST with a new country music format. In July 2000 KTEG would be moved to 104.7 (recently purchased from Continental Communications) to make way for the new country format to be launched on 107.9.

References

External links
KBQI official website

Country radio stations in the United States
BQI
Radio stations established in 1979
1979 establishments in New Mexico
IHeartMedia radio stations